Three athletes (two men and one woman) from Jamaica competed at the 1996 Summer Paralympics in Atlanta, United States.

See also
Jamaica at the Paralympics
Jamaica at the 1996 Summer Olympics

References 

Nations at the 1996 Summer Paralympics
1996
Summer Paralympics